Marie-Antoinette Rose is a Seychellois politician and journalist. She is a member of the National Assembly of Seychelles.  She subscribes for  Seychelles People's Progressive Front, and was first elected to the Assembly in 2006 on a proportional basis; she was re-elected in 2007.

References

External links

Member page on Assembly website

Year of birth missing (living people)
Living people
Members of the National Assembly (Seychelles)
Seychellois journalists
United Seychelles Party politicians
Seychellois women in politics
21st-century women politicians